Pay-ye Qaleh (also Romanized as Pāy-ye Qāl‘eh; also known as Eslāmābād (Persian: اسلام اباد), Pā Qal‘eh-ye Shādāb, and Pāyeh Qal‘eh) is a village in Shahi Rural District, Sardasht District, Dezful County, Khuzestan Province, Iran. At the 2006 census, its population was 172, in 38 families.

References 

Populated places in Dezful County